Red Priest is a British Baroque instrumental group that was formed in 1997 by Piers Adams. Currently it is composed of four performers: Adams on recorder, Adam Summerhayes on violin, Angela East on cello and David Wright on harpsichord. The group is named after the red-haired Italian priest and Baroque composer, Antonio Vivaldi.

The quartet plays in a flamboyant, theatrical and virtuosic style making use of props, costumes, dramatic lighting and other effects. The pieces they perform are generally their own arrangements, though based very closely on the original music by Vivaldi, Bach, et al.

In addition to touring all over the world, Red Priest are a frequent guest on BBC Radio 3's In Tune programme. They have released several albums, including a contemporary take on Vivaldi's The Four Seasons.

Discography 
 Priest On The Run - 1998
 Nightmare In Venice - 2002
 The 4 Seasons - 2003
 Pirates Of The Baroque - 2008
 Johann, I'm Only Dancing - 2009
 Handel In The Wind - 2014	
 The Baroque Bohemians - 2017

Previous members
 Julia Bishop – violinist
 Howard Beach - harpsichordist

References

External links 
 
 Red priest on Facebook

Red Priest
Red Priest
Musical groups established in 1997